Gypsophila petraea is a species of the genus Gypsophila in the plant family Caryophyllaceae. Endemic to the Eastern Carpathians and Southern Carpathians, Romania.

References

petraea
Flora of the Carpathians
Endemic flora of Romania